Chris Crowe (11 June 1939 – 30 April 2003) was an English international footballer who played as an inside forward and outside right.

Club career
Born in Newcastle upon Tyne (although he spent much of his youth living in Edinburgh and was selected for Scotland Schoolboys), Crowe played for Leeds United, Blackburn Rovers, Wolverhampton Wanderers, Nottingham Forest, Bristol City, Walsall, Auburn (Australia) and Bath City.

International career
Crowe earned one international cap for England in 1962, having also been selected at youth and under-23 levels.

References

1939 births
2003 deaths
English footballers
England international footballers
England under-23 international footballers
England youth international footballers
Scotland youth international footballers
Leeds United F.C. players
Blackburn Rovers F.C. players
Wolverhampton Wanderers F.C. players
Nottingham Forest F.C. players
Bristol City F.C. players
Walsall F.C. players
Bath City F.C. players
English Football League players
Association football inside forwards
Association football outside forwards
Footballers from Newcastle upon Tyne
Footballers from Edinburgh
Anglo-Scots
English expatriate footballers
English expatriate sportspeople in Australia
Expatriate soccer players in Australia